John Griffiths (born 27 January 1863, date of death unknown) was an English cricketer who played for Nottinghamshire. He was born in Long Eaton, Derbyshire.

Griffiths made a single first-class appearance for the side during the 1891 season, though he did not bat or bowl in the match and took no catches in the field.

External links
John Griffiths at Cricket Archive

1863 births
Year of death missing
English cricketers
Nottinghamshire cricketers
People from Long Eaton
Cricketers from Derbyshire